Scott Andrew Wagstaff (born 31 March 1990) is an English footballer who currently plays as a midfielder for Tonbridge Angels.

Early life
Wagstaff was born in Maidstone, and attended Bennett Memorial Diocesan School in Tunbridge Wells.

Career

Charlton Athletic
Wagstaff joined Charlton Athletic at the age of 8 after being spotted at a Charlton Athletic Community course. . He then captained Charlton's Under 18s on their run to the FA Youth Cup quarter finals. He made his debut in April 2008 against Barnsley, in the same match as Jonjo Shelvey made his debut. In the same season he was named as the club's young player of the year. Wagstaff joined Bournemouth on a month's loan in August 2008 and to Northwich Victoria for a month in November 2008. In December 2008 he was given a -year professional contract by Charlton manager Alan Pardew.

Wagstaff scored his first goal for Charlton in a league game against Walsall on 22 August 2009.

He was released by Charlton at the end of the 2012–13 season.

Bristol City
On 8 July 2013, Wagstaff signed for Bristol City on a three-year deal. He made his debut for Bristol City in a 2–2 draw against Bradford City, and scored in that game.

On 27 June 2016 Bristol City confirmed that Wagstaff would be leaving the club in search of first-team football.

Gillingham
He joined League One side Gillingham on a two-year deal on 7 July 2016. He scored his first goal for Gillingham in a 3–3 draw with Chesterfield on 27 September 2016.

He was released by Gillingham at the end of the 2017–18 season.

AFC Wimbledon
On 11 July 2018 it was announced the Wagstaff had signed with League One side AFC Wimbledon. On 26 January, Wagstaff scored two goals in AFC Wimbledon's FA Cup 4th Round defeat of West Ham United at Kingsmeadow.

Wagstaff was released by the club at the conclusion of the 2019–20 season, having made 72 appearances in all competitions and scoring 6 goals.

Forest Green Rovers
On 26 August 2020, Wagstaff joined Forest Green Rovers on a one-year deal.

On 24 May 2021, it was announced that Wagstaff would leave Forest Green Rovers at the end of the 2020–21 season.

Aldershot Town
On 7 October 2021, Wagstaff joined Aldershot Town for the 2021–22 season.

Bromley
On 7 January 2022, Wagstaff signed for National League side Bromley.

On 31 May 2022, it was confirmed that Wagstaff would leave Bromley following the end of his contract.

Tonbridge Angels
On 2 October 2022, Wagstaff signed for National League South side Tonbridge Angels.

Career statistics

Honours
Charlton Athletic
 League One: 2011–12

Bristol City
 League One: 2014–15
 Football League Trophy: 2014–15

References

External links
Scott Wagstaff player profile at cafc.co.uk

1990 births
Living people
Sportspeople from Maidstone
English footballers
Association football midfielders
Charlton Athletic F.C. players
AFC Bournemouth players
Northwich Victoria F.C. players
Leyton Orient F.C. players
Bristol City F.C. players
Gillingham F.C. players
AFC Wimbledon players
Forest Green Rovers F.C. players
Aldershot Town F.C. players
Bromley F.C. players
Tonbridge Angels F.C. players
English Football League players
National League (English football) players